The 2015 Tour de Hongrie was a six-day cycling stage race that took place in Hungary in August 2015. The race is the 36th edition of the Tour de Hongrie. It was rated as a 2.2 event as part of the 2015 UCI Europe Tour. The race included five stages+Prologue, starting in Szombathely on 4 August and returning there for the finish on 9 August in Budapest.

Schedule

Participating teams
16 teams were invited to the 2015 Tour de Hongrie: and 6 UCI Continental, 4 Regional, 1 national (Serbia) and 5 Hungarian teams.

Riders of 21 different nationalities participated, the largest numbers being from Hungary (32), Izrael, the Netherlands Norway, Serbia and Slovakia (6), Czech Republic and Germany (5), Spain (3), France, Luxembourg, Slovenia, Ukraine and United States (2), with Belgium, Colombia, Guatemala, Italy, Latvia, Lithuania and New Zealand all having 1.

The teams entering the race were:

Stages

Prologue
4 August 2015 — Szombathely, individual time trial (ITT)

Stage 1
5 August 2015 — Szombathely to Keszthely,

Stage 2
6 August 2015 — Balatonföldvár to Kecskemét,

Stage 3
7 August 2015 — Abony to Karcag,

Stage 4
8 August 2015 — Karcag to Kékestető,

Stage 5
9 August 2015 — Gyöngyös to Budapest (Buda Castle),

Classification leadership

Final standings

General classification

Points classification

Mountains classification

Young riders classification

Team classification

See also

 2015 in men's road cycling
 2015 in sports

References

External links
 Official website

2015
Tour de Hongrie
Tour de Hongrie